Igemar Pieternella (born 7 December 1967) is a Curaçao professional football player and manager.

Career
He played for the RKSV Centro Dominguito.

Since 2012 until 2013 he worked with the Curaçao national football team as assistant. In 2014, he was an interim coach of the Curaçao national football team.

References

External links

Profile at Soccerpunter.com

1967 births
Living people
Curaçao footballers
Dutch Antillean footballers
Association football midfielders
Sekshon Pagá players
RKSV Centro Dominguito players
Curaçao football managers
Curaçao national football team managers
Sekshon Pagá managers
Place of birth missing (living people)